The Hose Mountains are a mountain range in central Sarawak, Borneo. They span the area between the watersheds of the Balleh and Balui Rivers. The mountains are covered in virgin tropical rainforest that supports a rich ecosystem of fauna and flora, including many endemic species. At least 8 species of Nepenthes are native to the mountain range.

The Hose Mountains are named after British colonial administrator and zoologist Charles Hose.

References

Mountain ranges of Malaysia
Landforms of Sarawak